Shekhar Dixit (born 20 January 1984) is a farmers leader and President of Rashtriya Kisan Manch. He was previously president of Kisan Manch Uttar Pradesh, youth general secretary of Jan Morcha, and State president of Jantantra Morcha Uttar Pradesh.

Biography 
Dixit was born in 1984 in Lucknow, Uttar Pradesh. From the age of 17, he became involved in environmental activism. In 2002 he visited villages in the eastern districts of Uttar Pradesh and Seemanchal of Bihar, along with the central minister Alauddin Khan. Akhil Bhartiya Brahman Sabha honoured Dixit in 2004 for his environmental and social activism. He was also appointed as president of Akhil Bhartiya Brahman Sabha Uttar Pradesh.

In 2005, Dixit joined the Kisan Manch at the suggestion of Vishwanath Pratap Singh, former Prime Minister of India and patron of Kisan Manch. While president of the Kisan Manch New Delhi Unit, he was involved in humanitarian work for the slum dwellers of the city. In 2006 he campaigned against the acquisition of farming land in Dadri Andolan and for the rights of farmers.

In 2008, he was appointed as the state president of Rashtriya Kisan Manch in Uttar Pradesh.

He joined with social activist Anna Hazare Jan Andolan and was appointed as convener for Uttar Pradesh of Hazare's Jantantra Morcha.

From 2015, under Dixit's leadership, Kisan Manch Uttar Pradesh launched a campaign demanding more action from the government to help farmers in the state. Since then the organisation has continued campaigning in support of farmers in drought hit areas of Uttar Pradesh. In 2016, Dixit worked to prepare the political ground in Uttar Pradesh for Shri Nitish Kumar, Chief Minister of Bihar and leader of Janata Dal (United).

References

Indian farmers
1983 births
Living people
Politicians from Lucknow
Indian environmentalists
Activists from Uttar Pradesh